Checkpoint (original title: Machssomim) is a 2003 documentary film by Israeli filmmaker Yoav Shamir, showing the everyday interaction between Israeli soldiers and Palestinian civilians at several of the regions Israel Defense Forces checkpoints. The film won five awards at various film festivals, including Best International Documentary at the Hot Docs Canadian International Documentary Festival, best feature-length documentary at the International Documentary Film Festival Amsterdam and the Golden Gate Award for Documentary Feature at the San Francisco International Film Festival. Although the film was generally well received, it was also controversial and reactions from audience members and critics were sometimes very angry.

The film was produced with the support of The New Israeli Foundation for Cinema and Television.

Synopsis
Checkpoint is shot in cinéma vérité style with no narration and very little context. Shamir himself is absent from the film except for one scene in which a border guard asks him to try to make him "look good," and Shamir asks how he should do that.

The camera films people trying to cross at various checkpoints. At some, such as the high-tech fortress like that at the Gaza Strip crossing there are hundreds of people crowded, waiting to get through. At others such as at South Jenin there is just a truck blocking the road while Palestinians trickle by. Interactions vary, ranging from mundane to mildly frustrating to maddening in their unfairness. Sometimes people show their identification cards without incident but much of what Shamir has chosen to include are the messier incidences. A school bus full of kids (averaging around eight years old) the viewer sees several times and passes at South Jenin quite regularly (the bus driver says everyday) is emptied and told that it cannot proceed. A family is separated because a border guard does not see the need for the father to accompany his family to the doctor because he is not sick. A woman sends her crying children back home on their own because their papers are not in order. Hundreds ignore soldiers at one place and walk through to town, many carrying nothing but groceries. On the way to Nablus an ambulance is stopped and each passenger is forced to explain what their need for treatment is. A soldier calls Palestinians animals while they wait at Kalandia checkpoint in the snow. Sometimes the soldiers are obviously playing around with the people they are monitoring but often it seems that they are following arbitrary orders outside their control. The situation is only worsened by the fact that rarely does either party speak the same language: The entire film is spoken in patches of Arabic, Hebrew and English.

Significance

Checkpoint is a part of the independent digital documentary movement in the early 2000s, thanks to the introduction of relatively inexpensive digital tape-based video cameras and the sudden affordability of powerful desktop video editing systems.
This in-the-trenches filmmaking lent itself to direct cinema or cinéma vérité, a definition that spans from reality TV to the Pennebaker films of the 1960s.  Even the astoundingly popular documentaries in the 2000s such as Fahrenheit -9-11 and  Supersize Me may have been driven by narrative and personal point of view, but their camera style certainly draws on the vérité trope of letting reality play out before the camera.  Recalled as The Year of the Documentary,  these films came out in 2004 during a convergence of new media possibilities and world conflict including 9-11, as well as tensions in the Middle East during the Second Intifada,  according to Paul Falzone in his dissertation,  Documentary of Change.
“From this conflict emerges a generation of muckraking filmmakers and a new style of documenting filmmaking,” wrote Falzone. 
Maxine Baker in her book, “Documenting in the Digital Age” goes a bit further. She refers to the digital revolution as no less as explosive as the Lumiere Brothers’ invention of the Cinematograph during the turn of the 19th century.  According to Falzone, a specific kind of documentary was forged by filmmakers looking to challenge mainstream media's interpretation of events. She observed that this new batch of films tended to replace the protagonist with antagonist.  
In Checkpoint’s case, the director Shamir replaced the antagonist with the subject, which in turn served as the antagonist. 
But while the director may have omitted narration or any stated point of view, he sticks to the vérité technique of hammering home a focused point. Checkpoint follows the looming sense of futility from shutting down access between two groups of people.
In an interview with Documentary Film Quarterly in 2004,  Shamir says, “Everybody is like a victim; the soldiers, the Palestinians. I want to show what effects the occupation has on the Palestinians but even more what the effects are on society.”

Awards
The film received five festival awards, including Best Feature Documentary at the International Documentary Film Festival Amsterdam, Best International Documentary at the Hot Docs Canadian International Documentary Festival and the Golden Gate Award for Documentary Feature at the San Francisco International Film Festival.

References

Bibliography
Zanger, Anat. "Blind Space: Roadblock Movies in the Contemporary Film." Shofar: An Interdisciplinary Journal of Jewish Studies 24.1 (2005): 37–48. American University Library. Web.

External links

Israeli documentary films
2003 films
Documentary films about the Israeli–Palestinian conflict
2000s Hebrew-language films
2003 documentary films
Films directed by Yoav Shamir